The 2023 Miami FC season will be the club's fourth season in the USL Championship, the second-tier of American soccer, and ninth overall.

Roster 

Appearances and goals are career totals from all-competitions and leagues.

Staff
  Anthony Pulis – Head coach
  Lewis Neal  – Assistant coach
  Ryan Thamm  – Head of Performance
  Giuseppe Weller – Goalkeeper coach
  Keeler Watson – Equipment manager

Transfers

In

Out

Loan in

Loan out

Friendlies

Competitive

USL Championship

Standings — Eastern Conference

Results summary

Match results

U.S. Open Cup 

As a USL Championship club, Miami FC will enter the competition in the Second Round, played between April 4–6.

Squad statistics

Appearances and goals 

|-
! colspan="16" style="background:#dcdcdc; text-align:center"| Goalkeepers

|-
! colspan="16" style="background:#dcdcdc; text-align:center"| Defenders

|-
! colspan="16" style="background:#dcdcdc; text-align:center"| Midfielders

|-
! colspan="16" style="background:#dcdcdc; text-align:center"| Forwards

|-
|}

Goal scorers

Disciplinary record

References

External links
 

Miami FC
Miami FC
Miami FC seasons
Miami FC